Gerda Daumerlang (2 May 1920 – 16 March 2006) was a German diver who competed in the 1936 Summer Olympics. She was born in Nuremberg. In 1936 she finished fourth in the 3 metre springboard event.

References

External links
 

1920 births
2006 deaths
German female divers
Olympic divers of Germany
Divers at the 1936 Summer Olympics
Sportspeople from Nuremberg